Trillium Digital Systems, Inc. developed and licensed standards-based communications source code software to telecommunications equipment manufacturers for the wireless, broadband, Internet and telephone network infrastructure. Trillium was an early company to license source code. The Trillium Digital Systems business entity no longer exists, but the Trillium communications software is still developed and licensed. Trillium software is used in the network infrastructure as well as associated service platforms, clients and devices.

Company history

Trillium

Trillium was founded in February 1988 in Los Angeles, California. The co-founders were Jeff Lawrence and Larisa Chistyakov. Giorgio Propersi joined in September 1989. The initial capitalization of Trillium when it was incorporated was $1,000. The name Trillium came about because of a mistake. Jeff and Larisa asked for company name suggestions from family and friends. Someone suggested a character named Trillian from the book Hitchhiker's Guide to the Galaxy by Douglas Adams. They thought the suggestion was supposed to be trillium, a flower in the lily family. They liked the sound and symbolism of the name Trillium so they used it.

Trillium was started as a consulting company. Its first consulting jobs were to develop communications software for bisynchronous, asynchronous and multiprotocol PAD products. Consulting continued through the end of 1990. While consulting, the co-founders decided there was an opportunity to develop and license portable source code software for communications protocols. Towards the end of 1990 Trillium became focused on developing its own products.

Source code is a symbolic language (e.g., the C programming language) which is run through a compiler to generate binary code which can run on a particular microprocessor. Communications systems have a variety of hardware and software architectures, use a variety of microprocessors and use a variety of software development environments. It wasn't technically possible to develop a single piece of binary code that could run on many different systems. Source code, if properly designed and supported, can provide a highly leveragable solution that can be integrated and used in many different systems. The proper way to test source code is to compile it for all possible environments it might run in and then run and test it in those environments. There were as many environments as there were pieces of communications equipment. That testing approach was difficult. To overcome this difficulty Trillium developed an operating system called the Multiprocessor Operating System (MOS) that could run under commercially available operating systems such as DOS, Windows, Solaris and Linux and provide a simulation and testing environment for its software products.

Trillium's first software product supported the X.25 communications protocol. Subsequent products were developed for a number of data communications and voice communications protocols. Trillium's primary focus in its early years was on control plane and signalling plane protocols. In later years Trillium also developed some data plane protocols. A more comprehensive list of the software products developed by Trillium is listed in the Product History section. Trillium is currently developing software products to support the Femtocell communications protocols. Throughout its history Trillium was also very active in standards setting bodies including the CCITT/ITU, IETF, ATM Forum, Frame Relay Forum and others.

Trillium software products were used in communications and networking products designed for the PDN, PSTN, Internet, enterprise networks and home networks.
Trillium's evolution and development, paralleled the evolution and development of the communications industry. In 1988 there were less than 1/2 million Internet users, about 4 million cell phone users and no broadband (DSL, cable) users. The industry went through significant transitions from the mid-1980s through the early 2000s, as described in the market history section. By 2008 there were over 1.4 billion Internet users, almost 3.3 billion mobile phone users and over 1 billion broadband users.

During this period, communications equipment manufacturers licensed source code software to reduce their time to market, decrease their development risk and reduce their costs. By 1999 many companies offered source code software products. Some of these included:

Trillium was funded entirely by its cash flow from its founding through 1999. In late 1998, Trillium decided that to provide liquidity for its shareholders and accelerate its growth it should raise money through an initial public offering. After discussions with investment bankers, it was decided that to improve its initial public offering valuation, it would be necessary to first raise some private equity money to fund organizational expansion, revenue growth and revenue rebalancing. In early 1999, Trillium entered discussions with various venture capital and private equity firms. It closed two private equity deals, one with Rader Reinfrank & Co. in July 1999 for $10 million and the other with Intel Capital and its Intel Communications Fund in September 1999 for $4 million. Rader Reinfrank & Co. was the lead investor and Intel Capital was a co-investor. Trillium used the funds to accelerate the growth of its organization and product line in preparation for a planned initial public offering in either 2000 or 2001. Trillium received ISO 9001 certification in February 2000 and SEI -CMM Level 2 certification in December 2001.

Trillium, an Intel Company

During 1999 and 2000, a number of Trillium's competitors either went public, or were acquired.

In March 2000, following inquiries from potential acquirers, Trillium decided to explore its sale. Trillium created a list of potential acquirers that included communications equipment manufacturers, communications semiconductor companies and a few other companies.  Intel Corporation was part of this list since they were already an investor in Trillium. Craig Barrett, the CEO of Intel, felt it was important for Intel to be involved in the communications and networking business. Starting in 1997, and over a 5-year period, Intel spent over $10 billion acquiring communications chip, hardware and software companies. Intel acquired Trillium in a deal for $300 million that closed on August 24, 2000. Intel's objectives in acquiring Trillium were to expand the networking software available to its network processor, establish a viable entry into the networking software business to complement the network processor business as they moved to sell platform level solutions, and validate and optimize software designs to address high growth communications market segments including voice over IP and wireless.

As part of the closing, Intel certified there were no material adverse effects; any changes reasonably likely in the future to be materially adverse on the operations, assets, liabilities or earnings of Intel. On August 28, 2000, Intel stopped selling and recalled its Pentium III due to design defects and performance problems, on September 21, 2000, it issued an earnings warning and on September 28 it cancelled its Timna chip and delayed its Pentium 4 and Itanium chips due to design defects and performance problems. In just a little over a month (from August 24, 2000, to September 29, 2000) Intel stock plummeted from over $70 per share to $40 per share.

Trillium became a wholly owned subsidiary of Intel. It was renamed for external purposes as “Trillium, an Intel Company” and for internal purposes as the "Networking Software Division (NSD)". In 2002, NSD was renamed as the “Control Plane Processing Division (CPPD)”. The division was initially part of Intel's Network Communications Group, which later became the Intel Communications Group. Jeff Lawrence moved into Intel when the deal closed, and Larisa Chistyakov stayed with Trillium. The functional integration of Trillium into Intel was considered successful, but the strategic and value integration was considered less successful. After the deal closed Trillium continued to focus on offering its communications software products and professional services to external customers and also started to develop cross divisional and business group customers within Intel. Trillium focused significant resources on integrating its software products into Intel network processors and related products.

Jeff Lawrence left Intel in March and Larisa Chistyakov left Intel in September 2002. Larisa died on December 22, 2008.

Continuous Computing, Trillium Software

As the dot-com bubble burst in 2000 and 2001, Intel started selling many of its communications businesses. Continuous Computing, based in San Diego, California, acquired Trillium's intellectual property, customers and also hired some Trillium engineering, sales and marketing staff from Intel in February 2003.

Continuous Computing continued to license Trillium software, develop additional software Trillium software products and also bundle the software with its products. Trillium software products celebrated their 20th anniversary in 2008.

RadiSys, Trillium Software

RadiSys, which provides hardware and software for Internet-based telecommunications, announced on May 3, 2011, that it was going to acquire Continuous Computing and its Trillium software products in a deal valued at $120 million. RadiSys and Continuous Computing are focused on complementary areas of networking technology.

Reliance Jio

Reliance Jio, an Indian telecommunications carrier, announced in July 2018 that it was going to acquire Radisys for $1.72 per share, or $74 million in total. Reliance Jio is focused on 5G, IoT, and open-source architecture adoption.

Market history

There were a number of regulatory, financial and technology events that drove the telecommunications industry, and subsequently drove Trillium's growth and development.

 General network infrastructure moved from time division multiplexing to statistical multiplexing and from character based communications to packet based communications.
Work on the OSI reference model was initiated in 1977. The OSI reference model is an abstract description for layered communications and computer network protocol design.
 Telephone network infrastructure moved from In-band signalling to out-of-band signalling.
 Computing and communications moved from closed and proprietary mainframe based systems to open systems.
 Equipment manufacturers moved from in-house technology development to buying or licensing hardware and software technology from other technology providers.
 Different voice, data and video networking technologies converged.
 Equipment manufacturers moved from using proprietary software solutions to open source software solutions.
The breakup of AT&T was initiated in 1974 by the U.S. Department of Justice antitrust suit against the telephone company's monopoly. In 1982, AT&T agreed to break itself up into several firms in 1984. The breakup of the AT&T's monopoly led to a surge of competition in the long-distance telecommunications market as new carriers came into existence. It also improved the ability of other companies to sell their equipment to the regional Bell operating companies.
The first TCP/IP based wide area network became operational in 1983. The Internet was opened to commercial interests in 1988 and was initially used for e-mail, file transfer and other applications.
The first release of the Mosaic Web browser was in late 1994.
The stock market crashed in 1987. A recession followed, starting in mid-1990 and ending in 1991.
Software bugs in the switching systems of the core network caused massive failures in the telephone networks of AT&T in 1990 and Bell Atlantic and Pacific Bell in 1991. These network crashes shutdown telephone service for large portions of the United States and prompted Congressional investigations into the reliability of the telephone network.
The U.S. Federal Communications Commission (FCC) started competitive wireless spectrum auctions in 1994.
The Telecommunications Act of 1996 was signed into law in early 1996. It deregulated portions of the telecommunications industry and led to a surge of competition in the local access, wireless and other markets. Other countries also started deregulating their telecommunications industries.
The Asian financial crisis erupted in mid-1997 as poor fundamentals, structural weaknesses and a shift in investor sentiments caused liquidity problems in the financial systems of a number of Asian countries. The crisis stabilized by the beginning of 1999.
The dot com bubble started growing in the mid to late 1990s and burst in 2000. The bubble was driven by a large increase in Internet access, large increase in wireless handset availability, and a belief that data intensive applications were going to drive the next generation network. The network was moving from being voice centric to data centric, from narrowband technologies to broadband technologies and from 2nd generation wireless to 3rd generation wireless technologies to accommodate real and perceived demand. Data bandwidth needs were doubling every 3–4 months. As the bubble burst, network operators, service providers, equipment manufacturers and others suffered huge losses. Over $2 trillion in market capitalization evaporated in less than 12 months and over 500,000 jobs were lost. Over 60 telecommunications carriers in the U.S. filed for bankruptcy between 2000 and 2002. By the end of 2000, it was difficult for companies to raise money through private equity funding or initial public offerings.

Product technology

All Trillium products are based on the Trillium Advanced Portability Architecture (TAPA), a set of architectural and coding standards designed to ensure that the individual source code software products are portable and independent of the target system's compiler, processor, operating system and architecture. Each software product is provided as C source code and has four programming interfaces: the system services interface, the layer management interface, the upper interface and the lower interface. TAPA describes the parameters and expected behavior across each interface.

Individual Trillium software products consist of tens of thousands to hundreds of thousands of lines of source code. Each Trillium software product could be used separately, or in conjunction with other software products to build complete protocol stacks. Trillium software products were also able to support different national and industry variants of specific protocols. In later years, as the different network infrastructure technologies converged, Trillium software products were able to support interworking and translation between the different network infrastructure technologies (e.g. telephony to Internet Protocols). They were used in a wide range of network equipment, products and devices.

Product history

During its history, Trillium has developed over 150 software products, which parallel the evolution and development of the network infrastructure. These software products support communications protocols specified in international (e.g. ITU), national (e.g. ANSI) and industry (e.g. IETF) standards. These products are licensed primarily to telecommunications equipment manufacturers and include:

Trillium software has been used in over 500 communications and networking products.

Trillium poster

Trillium conceived of and published a poster that provided detailed technical information about the network infrastructure and protocols in an attractive format that was easy to understand. It became an indispensable tool for the communications industry, and was displayed on the office walls and conference rooms of tens of thousands of engineers, venture capitalists and financial analysts around the world. The poster is periodically updated to reflect changes in the network infrastructure and protocols. The 1st generation poster was published in 1997 and was inspired by the "ISO and CCITT Data Communication Standards" poster published by Retix. The 5th generation of the poster was published in 2008.

Further reading
"Trillium Digital Systems Case Study: 1988–1995". Jeff Lawrence, 2004.
"Trillium Digital Systems Case Study: 1996–2003". Jeff Lawrence, 2004.
"Trillium Digital Systems, An Intel Company. A Case Study & An Analysis of the Protocols in the Voice Over IP Arena". Shramik Jyothula and Sridhar Dronamraju.
"Roadmap to Entrepreneurial Success".
"How You Can Become Ma Bell". Karen Kaplan. Los Angeles Times, March 25, 1996.
"Growing Lean". Douglas Young. Los Angeles Business Journal, December 2, 1996.
"Network Broker". Communications News. October 1998.
"Preparation Counts More Than Luck". Juan Hovey. Los Angeles Times, October 6, 1999.

Notes and references

External links
 

Companies based in San Diego
Defunct telecommunications companies of the United States
Network protocols
Software companies based in California
Embedded systems
Defunct software companies of the United States
Telecommunications infrastructure
Telecommunications companies established in 1988
American companies established in 1988